Chesham Grammar School is a co-educational grammar school on White Hill, Chesham, Buckinghamshire. There are about 1,300 pupils aged between eleven and eighteen, including over 400 in the sixth form. In 2007, the Department for Education awarded the school specialist school status as a Humanities College. In August 2011 the school became an Academy.

History
The school was founded in 1947 as the Chesham Technical School - a result of the Education Act 1944 which set up the tripartite arrangements of grammar, technical and secondary modern schools. The all-boys' school was originally housed in only one building, which is now the sixth form block known as "The Curtis Centre". In 1961, the school became known as Chesham Technical High School and during the 1960s, there was huge development in the area, and it became a co-educational grammar school. In 1970, the school changed its name to Chesham High School as it moved away from its technical roots. The name of the school changed to Chesham Grammar School on 7 May 2010. As a grammar school, CGS underwent expansion and experienced an improvement in exam results. The school was rated outstanding in all categories by OFSTED in March 2014.

Headteachers
Sidney Chapman (1947–1966)
Paddy Evans (1966–1967)
Ken Stokes (1967–1992)
Tim Andrew (1992–2007)
Nigel Fox (2005–2006) (acting during Tim Andrew's sabbatical)
Philip Wayne (2007–2015)
Annmarie McNaney (2015–present)

Facilities
Between 1980 and 2010, there was major expansion of the school, including a new maths block, a textiles block, an art block, expansion of the English block, a new library and a new drama/psychology block. In 2015, the sixth form centre, located in the original building, was expanded and reopened as the Curtis Centre.

The Prime Minister's Global Fellowship 
Pupils attained places on the Prime Minister's Global Fellowship programme in the inaugural year 2008, and in 2009 had two more successful applicants.

Admissions and school performance
Admission to the school is brokered through Buckinghamshire County Council, which operates a selective secondary education system throughout the county. Pupils have to achieve a mark of 121 or above in the 11-plus to be eligible to attend the school. The school's catchment area broadly covers the whole of Chiltern District area which includes the towns of Amersham, Chalfont St Giles, Chalfont St Peter and Chesham, and larger villages such as Great Missenden and Little Chalfont.  A significant proportion of the intake also comes from Hertfordshire. As Chesham Station is a terminus on the Metropolitan Line of the London Underground, pupils also travel in from North London.  The school's progress profile shows that these pupils perform at a comparatively similar level at GCSE and A level.

Notable alumni

Alex Hales, cricketer
Eleanor Thom, writer
Judith Gough, diplomat and Ambassador of the United Kingdom in Sweden
Len Worley,  footballer
Conor Dunne, cyclist 
Katy Dunne, tennis player
Nick Keynes, bass player
Yashvardhan Kumar Sinha, Indian diplomat
Eileen Ramsay, maritime photographer.

References

External links
Department for Education Performance Tables 2011

Chesham
Grammar schools in Buckinghamshire
Academies in Buckinghamshire
Educational institutions established in 1947
1947 establishments in England